The New Orleans Pelicans are a professional basketball team based in New Orleans, Louisiana.  They are members of the Southwest Division of the Western Conference in the National Basketball Association (NBA).  The franchise began play during the 2002–03 NBA season as the New Orleans Hornets following the relocation of the Charlotte Hornets, based in Charlotte, North Carolina. After three seasons in New Orleans, Hurricane Katrina forced the franchise to temporarily relocate to Oklahoma City, Oklahoma, where they spent two seasons as the New Orleans/Oklahoma City Hornets.  The Hornets returned to New Orleans full-time for the 2007–08 season.  The team changed its name to the New Orleans Pelicans at the conclusion of the 2012–13 season.

Led by All-Star Baron Davis, the New Orleans Hornets qualified for their first post-season appearance during the 2002–03 season. They lost to the Philadelphia 76ers in the first round.  The team earned their first division title during the 2007–08 season, behind the play of All-Stars Chris Paul and David West. Finishing with a franchise-best record of 56 wins and 26 losses, the Hornets won the Southwest Division title over the defending champion San Antonio Spurs. They advanced to the Conference Semifinals, where they were defeated by the Spurs in seven games.

In 20 seasons, the Pelicans have compiled an overall record of 740–864 all-time. They have qualified the playoffs eight times, winning two series, and posted seven seasons of 41 wins or more.

Seasons

All-time records

Note: statistics are correct as of May 16, 2022

Notes
 Due to the catastrophic devastation brought by Hurricane Katrina upon the communities of southeastern Louisiana, the Hornets franchise temporarily relocated their base of operations to Oklahoma City in 2005–06 and 2006–07. During this time, the franchise was known as the New Orleans/Oklahoma City Hornets.
 Due to a lockout, the 2011–12 season did not start until December 25, 2011, and all 30 teams played a shortened 66-game regular season schedule.

References

 
Seasons